

Capers Jones is an American specialist in software engineering methodologies, and is often associated with the function point model of cost estimation.

He was born in St Petersburg, Florida, United States and graduated from the University of Florida, having majored in English. He later became the President and CEO of Capers Jones & Associates and latterly Chief Scientist Emeritus of Software Productivity Research (SPR).

In 2011, he co-founded Namcook Analytics LLC, where he is Vice President and Chief Technology Officer (CTO).

He formed his own business in 1984, Software Productivity Research, after holding positions at IBM and ITT. After retiring from Software Productivity Research in 2000, he remains active as an independent management consultant.

He is a Distinguished Advisor to the Consortium for IT Software Quality (CISQ).

References

Bibliography
 Programming Productivity, Capers Jones, Mcgraw-Hill, 1986. .
 Software Assessments, Benchmarks and Best Practices, Capers Jones, Addison-Wesley Professional, 2000. .
 Estimating Software Costs 2nd Edition, Capers Jones, McGraw-Hill, 2007. .
 Software Engineering Best Practices : lessons from successful projects in the top companies, Capers Jones, McGraw-Hill, 2010, .
 The Economics of Software Quality, Capers Jones, Olivier Bonsignour and Jitendra Subramanyam, Addison-Wesley Longman, 2011. .
 The Technical and Social History of Software Engineering, Capers Jones, Addison-Wesley, 2014. .

External links
 

Year of birth missing (living people)
Living people
People from St. Petersburg, Florida
University of Florida College of Liberal Arts and Sciences alumni
American computer specialists
American technology chief executives
Software engineering researchers
Computer science writers
IBM employees